Kehinde Oluwatoyin Ladipo is a Nigerian geologist. He is a fellow of the Nigerian Academy of Science, elected into the Academy's Fellowship at its Annual General Meeting held in January 2015.

Biography 
Ladipo spent over fifteen years working at Shell Nigeria. After retiring from Shell, Ladipo helped set up a postgraduate school of geoscience at the University of Benin.

References

Living people
Nigerian geologists
Year of birth missing (living people)

Nigerian scientists